Phosphatidate phosphatase PPAPDC1A also known as phosphatidic acid phosphatase type 2 domain containing 1A is an enzyme that in humans is encoded by the PPAPDC1A gene. PPAPDC1A has phosphatidate phosphatase activity.

References